Janet Yale is a Canadian telecommunications lawyer and association executive. She became president and chief executive officer of the Arthritis Society in June 2012. She is also on the board of directors of CARE Canada. From September 2010 to November 2011, she was CEO of Scouts Canada. She left Scouts Canada in November 2011, citing "philosophical differences" with its board of directors, rather than media reports of how Scouts Canada had handled allegations of sexual abuse by scout leaders. 

Janet Yale was born in Montreal, Quebec, and went to Town of Mount Royal High School. She later studied and obtained her Bachelor from McGill University and the University of Toronto. 

During her career, she would also work for Telus as Executive Vice President, a Canadian telecommunication company, the Canadian Cable Television Association,  
the Canadian Radio-television and Telecommunications Commission and the Consumers' Association of Canada. 

In 2007 Yale gave a $75,000 donation to the Great Canadian Theatre Company in Ottawa in honour of her mother, Lorraine Fritzy Yale.

References

Lawyers in Ontario
Living people
Canadian philanthropists
Canadian women chief executives
Telus people
Canadian women lawyers
Year of birth missing (living people)